Kloof Nek Road, one of South Africa's oldest roads, was built in 1848 as an access road for the suburban pass with the same name which was used primarily as a look-out post for soldiers and a supply route to Camps Bay. The route starts at Kloof Street on the edge of the city bowl and turns into Camps Bay Road at the end of a mountain pass running between Table Mountain and Lion's Head. Despite being only two kilometers long, it is very steep with an average gradient 1:11. The summit of Kloof Nek Road is a small but complicated intersection that's not clearly visible on approach and often catches motorists unaware. The road's steepness may be a contributor to the regular occurrence of often-fatal accidents on Kloof Nek Road.

Attractions, entertainment and activities along Kloof Nek Road

Table Mountain National Park
 Turn into Tafelberg Road, the Table Mountain Aerial Cableway access road, from Kloof Nek Road when coming from the city bowl.
 Several mountain hiking trails can be accessed from Tafelberg Road, just off Kloof Nek Road, where free parking can also be found.

Restaurants and Night Life
 Rafiki's
 Hallelujah
 Beleza
 Kyoto Garden Sushi
 The Power and the Glory
 Maharajah
 The Sorrows
 The Black Ram

Popular Attractions
 Torino Chocolate House
 Christopher Moller Art Gallery
 Dinkel Bakery

Accommodation
 Kloof Nek Suites
 129 On Koof Nek

Transport
 Every 1–5 minutes, buses run from the city center to Camps Bay. There are several stops in Kloof Nek Road as well as a stop close to the  entrance of Tafelberg Road for visitors to the Table Mountain Aerial Cableway. 
 The MyCiTi Bus service runs a free shuttle from the parking area in Tafelberg Road to the Cableway boarding station in order to avoid congestion.

See also 
Cape Town 
Table Mountain 
Lion's Head 
Table Mountain National Park 
Table Mountain Aerial Cableway

References

External links
 The Black Ram
 Torino Chocolate House
 Accident in Kloof Nek Road
 Steep Kloof Nek Road

Roads in Cape Town